Justellus, Justel is a surname. Notable people with the surname include:
 Ana Justel, Spanish statistician and Antarctic scientist
 Christophe Justel (1580–1649), French scholar
 Henri Justel (1619–1693), French scholar, royal administrator, bibliophile, and librarian, son of Christophe